Fairfield City Schools is an independent municipal school district in Jefferson County, Alabama.  It is governed by the Fairfield Board of Education.   The Board is responsible for the following:
 C. J. Donald Elementary School
 Glen Oaks Elementary School
 Robinson Elementary School
 Forest Hills Community Development Center
 Fairfield High Preparatory School

Failing schools
Statewide testing ranks the schools in Alabama. Those in the bottom six percent are listed as "failing." As of early 2018, two of the seven local schools were included in this category:
 Fairfield High Preparatory School
 Glen Oaks elementary school

References

External links
 

Education in Jefferson County, Alabama